Legrain is a French surname. Notable people with the surname include:

Georges Legrain (1865–1917), French Egyptologist
Marcel Legrain (1890–1915), French rugby union player
Paul Legrain, French cyclist
Philippe Legrain, British political economist and writer
Pierre Legrain (1920–2005), French hammer thrower

See also
Rachel Legrain-Trapani (born 1988), French beauty pageant winner

French-language surnames